Lushuihe is a town in Fusong County, Baishan, Jilin, China.

Administration
, it administers the following six residential communities and five villages:
Zhanxi Community
Hebei Community
Dongshan Community
Beishan Community
Hongwei Community
Xishan Community
Lizihe Village
Changsheng Village
Xinxing Village
Dongsheng Village
Qingshuihe Village

Location 
The town is east of China National Highway 201 which is how the town is connected.

Tourism 
Lushuihe has an international hunting ground on the tri-point of the town's adjacent counties, Antu County and Changbai Korean Autonomous County in Yanbian Korean Autonomous Prefecture but is still part of the administrative borders. The hunting ground is part of the Lushui River National Park on Songjiang River. The hunting ground is also 60 kilometres northeast of Changbai Mountain on the North Korean Border, and covers about 25,786 hectares.

The hunting ground can get snow in the summertime because of seasonal lag. Average temperatures in winter can reach -25°C, when the Songjiang River will freeze but the Lushui River will not, because its water temperature is artificially kept at 7°C and the discharge is high. The hunting ground is arguably on Changbai Mountain because of its high prominence of 30 kilometres. Although the hunting ground was primitive, the hunting ground was only officially established in 1987 with the approval of the Ministry of Forestry and became open to tourism only then. More than 30,000 tourists visit the hunting ground per year.

Industries 
Jisen Wood Industry is a wood industry that operates sawmills and planes mills, the company's sub-industries include logging, papermaking and designing wood/paper products. The company is headquartered in Lushuihe.

References

Fusong County
Township-level divisions of Jilin